In rhetoric, synonymia (Greek: syn, "alike" + onoma, "name") is the use of several synonyms together to amplify or explain a given subject or term.  It is a kind of repetition that adds emotional force or intellectual clarity. Synonymia often occurs in parallel fashion.

Example 
 The tribune Marullus taunts the Roman populace in Shakespeare's Julius Caesar for their fickleness, calling the people several different pejorative names: "You blocks, you stones, you worse than senseless things!"

See also 
Figure of speech
Trope (linguistics)

References 

Rhetoric

fi:Synonymia